Three ships of the United States Navy have borne the name USS Reuben James.  Reuben James was a boatswain's mate who distinguished himself fighting the Barbary pirates.

 The first , a four-stack , was the first US Navy ship sunk by hostile action in the European Theatre in World War II.
 The third  was an  guided missile frigate.

United States Navy ship names